Big Brother was the sixth season of the Danish reality television series Big Brother and the third and final season to air on Kanal 5, produced by Endemol. The housemates entered on 30 December 2013, with the launch show airing on 1 January 2014 running for 119 days concluding on 27 April 2014 making it the longest series of Big Brother to air in Denmark to date. David Feldstedt was announced as the winner of the season on 27 April 2014.

On 19 June 2014 Kanal 5 announced that they had axed Big Brother in Denmark after three years on the channel.

Housemates 
For the first time in Denmark, each housemate had a secret, based on the original format Secret Story.

Andreas 
Andreas Ahrenskjær is 21 and is from Ballerup.

Camilla 
Camilla B. Nielsen was a previous housemate in Big Brother 2013. She is 38 and is from Frederiksberg.

Cecilie 
Cecilie Nielsen is 19 and is from Farum.

David 
David Feldstedt was a previous housemate in Big Brother 2013. He is 33 and is from Skovlunde.

Frida 
Frida Susan Møller is 21 and is from Mariager.

Ginna 
Ginna Bennet is 24 and is from Greve Strand.
 Secret: "I believe in spirits and ghosts."

Jimmi 
Jimmi Jacobsen is 30 and is from Nakskov.

Jonathan 
Jonathan Jensen is 18 and is from Ballerup.

Johannes 
Johannes Poulsen is 22 and is from Copenhagen.

Karoline 
Karoline Zederkopff is 20 and is from Kirke Hyllinge.
 Secret: "I spent 10,000 kr on Pokemon."

Karsten 
Karsten Nielsen is 31 and is from Østerbro.
 Secret: "I party with my mom at Sunny Beach."

Kenneth 
Kenneth Friis is 28 and is from Greve Strand.

Klaus 
Klaus Snedker is 32 and is from Rødovre.
 Secret: "I slept with one of my mom's friend."

Mark 
Mark Bøgelund is 19 and is from Vestamager.

Nicki 
Sabina Nikita "Nicki" Barth is 20 and is from Nørrebro.
 Secret: "I could kill with her bow and arrow when she was playing role-playing."

Nirvana 
Nirvana Kelecija is 29 and is from Odense.
 Secret: "Hendes ældste fisse er gammel"

Patrich 
Patrich Jensen is 22 and is from Brøndby.

Rasmus 
Rasmus Kiærskou is 24 and is from Sydhavnen.
 Secret: "My biggest idol is Ole Henriksen."

Ronnie 
Ronnie Bruun is 33 and is from Køge.

Sabina 
Sabina is 24 and is from Copenhagen.
 Secret: "I have been in a relationship for 12 years and have a 5 years old daughter."

Sandra 
Sandra Svensson is 24 and is from Vanløse.
 Secret: "I'm got a dildo from my parents."

Secrets 
As a twist in the first week, females had to guess correctly all male secrets if they wanted to be immune. It did not happen, so the male were immune. In the second week it was supposed that the males guess the female secrets, however, after Sabina revealed her secret, the twist of guessing the secrets was canceled.

Nominations table 
The first nomination is for 2 points, and the second one is for 1 point.

Notes

Nominations total received

References

External links 
 
Official Facebook

2014 Danish television seasons
06